Safe third country is a country that is neither the home country of an asylum seeker or the country in which they are seeking asylum, but that is considered safe for them to be removed to.

References

Immigration law